KISH (102.9 FM) is Guam's first all-Chamorro-Music-formatted FM station. They are owned and operated by Inter-Island Communications and is licensed to Hagåtña. The station signed on the air in May 2003.

See also 
 KICH (AM): Former Chamorro AM station

External links 
 
 

ISH
2003 establishments in Guam
Radio stations established in 2003
Hagåtña, Guam
Chamorro